The president of the Naval War College is a flag officer in the United States Navy. The President's House in Newport, Rhode Island is their official residence.

The office of the president was created along with the Naval War College as a whole by U.S. Navy General Order 325, signed by Secretary of the Navy William E. Chandler on 6 October 1884. The order stipulated that a commissioned officer of the Navy no lower in grade than commander be in charge of the college and that that officers title be "president." It also directed that the president be presiding officer of a board consisting of the president and all of the colleges faculty and responsible for determining the professional course of study for students at the college.

General Order 325 identified the colleges first president as Commodore Stephen B. Luce, who took office on the day Chandler signed the order. The last captain to serve as president left the position in 1913, after which all presidents have been flag officers. Since 1948, all presidents of the Naval War College have been vice admirals or rear admirals.

While college activities were suspended during the Spanish–American War, the presidency was vacant. When activities were again suspended during World War I, and during periods since World War I between the departure of an outgoing president and the arrival of a successor, acting presidents have administered the college until a new president reported for duty.

The college counts individuals who serve more than once as president as a separate president for each tour for purposes of chronological numbering of the presidents. Acting presidents are not counted.

The presidency of the Naval War College is one of only four positions in the United States Navy which has an official portrait associated with it, the others being the secretary of the Navy, the chief of naval operations, and the superintendent of the United States Naval Academy. The Naval War College Museum holds in its collection the official portraits of all but ten of the presidents, including all presidents since 1939.

Presidents
Presidents of the Naval War College in chronological order.

Notes

References
 Hattendorf, John B., B. Mitchell Simpson, III and John R. Wadleigh. Sailors and Scholars: The Centennial History of the U.S. Naval War College. Newport, Rhode Island: Naval War College Press, 1984.
 Jackson, John E., Jondavid Duvall, and Kimberly Rhoades, eds. Naval War College Illustrated History and Guide, Second Edition. Washington, D.C.: Government Printing Office, 2010. , .

External links
 Past Presidents page at the Naval War College official website
 President's House Occupants at the Naval War College official website

 
Naval War College
President